The West Virginia Department of Environmental Protection is a government agency of the U.S. state of West Virginia.

The Department originated as the Division of Environmental Protection (an agency of the Department of Commerce, Labor and Environmental Resources), created in October 1992. The Division was elevated to a Cabinet-level Department in 2001.

See also
 Climate change in West Virginia

References

External links

A-1 Certified Environmental Services LLC

Environment of West Virginia
State environmental protection agencies of the United States
State agencies of West Virginia
West Virginia